The Bernard F. Conners Prize for Poetry is given by the Paris Review "for the finest poem over 200 lines published in The Paris Review in a given year", according to the magazine. The winner is awarded $1,000.

A "given year" for the Paris Review appears not to mean "calendar year". The magazine's awards sometimes go to more than one poet in a calendar year and to none in other calendar years.

Winners 

2004: Jeremy Glazier, Issue 171, for "Conversations with the Sidereal Messenger”
2003: Julie Sheehan, Issue 167, for “Brown-headed Cow Birds”
2002: Timothy Donnelly, Issue 164, “His Long Imprison'd Thought”
2001: Gabrielle Calvocoressi, Issue 160, “Circus Fire, 1944”
2000: Corey Marks, Issue 155, “Renunciation”
2000: Christopher D. Patton, Issue 157, “Broken Ground”
1999: J.D. McClatchy, Issue 152, “Tattoos”
1998: Neil Azevedo, Issue 148, “Caspar Hauser Songs”
1998: Sherod Santos, Issue 149, “Elegy for My Sister”
1997: John Drury, Issue 145, “Burning the Aspern Papers”
1996: Sarah Arvio, Issue 140, “Visits from the Seventh”
1996: John Voiklis, Issue 139, “The Princeling's Apology”
1995: Vijay Seshadri, Issue 137, “Lifeline”
1994: Marilyn Hacker, Issue 131, “Cancer Winter”
1994: Stewart James, Issue 132, “Vanessa”
1993: Stephen Yenser, Issue 129, “Blue Guide”
1992: Tony Sanders, Issue 126, “The Warning Track”
1991: Donald Hall, Issue 123, “Museum of Clear Ideas”
1990: Christopher Logue, Issue 117, “Kings”
1989: Jorie Graham, Issue 110, “Spring”
1988: David Lehman, Issue 106, “Mythologies”
1986: John Koethe, Issue 102, “Mistral”
1985: James Schuyler, Issue 96, “A Few Days”
1984: Gjertrud Schnackenberg, Issue 94, “Imaginary Prisons”
1984: Sharon Ben-Tov, Issue 93, “Carillon for Cambridge Women”
1982: Gerald Stern, Issue 83, “Father Guzman”
1981: Frank Bidart, Issue 80, “The War of Vaslav Nijinsky”

See also 
American poetry
List of poetry awards
List of literary awards
List of years in poetry
List of years in literature

References

External links 

 Bernard F. Conners Website
 Paris Review awards Web page

Poetry awards